Bambaloni, also referred to as bambalouni, is a sweet Tunisian donut. It can be made at home or bought from fast food shops. It is prepared with a flour dough fried in oil. The bambaloni is eaten sprinkled with sugar or soaked in honey. It can be eaten at any time of day. It inspired the Sfenj donut that is widely consumed throughout the Maghreb, which is also known as sfinz in Libya.

Gallery

See also 

Bombolone, the Italian version of the Bambalouni
Sfenj
Sfinz
List of doughnut varieties
List of fried dough varieties 
Cuisine of Tunisia 
Tulumba
Fritelli
Puff-puff

Cuisine of Libya 
Cuisine's that originate in Libya

References

External links

Arab cuisine
Doughnuts
Tunisian cuisine
Fast food